The 1921 New Year Honours in New Zealand were appointments by King George V on the advice of the New Zealand government to various orders and honours to reward and highlight good works by New Zealanders. The awards celebrated the passing of 1920 and the beginning of 1921, and were announced on 1 January 1921.

The recipients of honours are displayed here as they were styled before their new honour.

Knight Bachelor
 The Honourable Theophilus Cooper – a judge of the Supreme Court.
 George Hunter  – member of the House of Representatives. Has rendered valuable assistance in connection with the settlement of returned soldiers.

Order of Saint Michael and Saint George

Companion (CMG)
 Dr Ernest Augustus Boxer – president of the New Zealand Returned Soldiers' Association.
 Gavin Macaulay Hamilton  – lately secretary to the governor-general and commander-in-chief of New Zealand.

References

New Year Honours
1921 awards
1921 in New Zealand
New Zealand awards